The Pontop Pike transmitting station is a facility for telecommunications and broadcasting situated on a 312-metre (1,024-ft) high hill of the same name between Stanley and Consett, County Durham, near the village of Dipton, England. It is owned and operated by Arqiva.

History
The mast was built in 1953, by BICC with Rowridge (also ) and North Hessary Tor in Devon.

Its construction was brought forward by the BBC so that people in North East England could watch the Coronation of Queen Elizabeth II live on the 405-line television system VHF then in use in the UK.  Test transmissions from a low-power temporary aerial began on Monday, 20 April 1953, and the first programmes were transmitted on Friday, 1 May 1953, in plenty of time for the Coronation on 2 June. UHF transmissions began in 1966 with the first colour transmissions in 1970, and the VHF television signal was switched off in 1985.

Coverage
The Pontop Pike transmitter provides digital television transmissions to Tyne and Wear, County Durham, Tees Valley, most of Northumberland and parts of North Yorkshire.  It also carries the national BBC Radio FM signals, covering the whole North East, as well as 95.4 MHz FM BBC Newcastle. It was one of the first national FM transmitters in December 1955. All of its television output is within the C/D aerial group.

Digital TV switchover
Analogue TV transmissions from this mast began to close from 12 September 2012 and completely ceased on 26 September that year, making Pontop Pike, alongside Bilsdale and Chatton, the last-but-one transmitter group in the United Kingdom to complete digital switchover (DSO) with Northern Ireland being the last area to switch. In July 2007 it was confirmed by Ofcom that Pontop Pike would remain a C/D group after DSO.

Pontop Pike underwent its 700 MHz clearance between September and November 2019 when its output moved down the band from a C/D group to a K group. Thus people with original C/D group aerials, who live in poor reception areas, may struggle to pick up some channels (see graph).

Services listed by frequency

Analogue radio

Digital radio

Digital television

Before 700 MHz clearance

Before switchover

Analogue television
Analogue television from Pontop Pike has now ceased permanently. BBC2 analogue was switched off on 12 September 2012 and the remaining three on 26 September 2012. Pontop Pike never transmitted analogue Channel 5. Instead it was transmitted from Burnhope on UHF 68.

Relay services
Being the main broadcasting transmitter, there are also a number of relays (or repeaters) to cover patches where this transmitter can't properly serve.

Analogue radio

Digital television
The following is a list of the television relays served by Pontop Pike:

See also

 List of masts
 List of radio stations in the United Kingdom

References

External links
 Info and pictures of Pontop Pike transmitter including historical power/frequency changes and present co-receivable transmitters.
 Entry on Pontop Pike on The Transmission Gallery
 Historical essay with some background detail
 Pontop Pike Transmitter at thebigtower.com

Radio masts and towers in Europe
Buildings and structures in County Durham
Transmitter sites in England